The Azuero spider monkey (Ateles geoffroyi azuerensis) is a possible subspecies of spider monkey that is in critical danger of extinction according to the IUCN Red List of Threatened Species. Common names of this subspecies include mono charro, mono charao and mono araña. The Azuero subspecies is one of three types of spider monkeys in Panama; Ateles geoffroyi panamensis with a range spanning from Costa Rica to Darién excluding the Azuero, Ateles geoffroyi fusciceps, with a range spanning Panamá and Colón provinces, and Ateles geoffroyi azuerensis, the Azuero spider monkey, whose range encompasses only the Azuero Peninsula.

Foraging habits
Although no published research pertaining specifically to the eating habits of the Azuero spider monkey exists, spider monkeys in general are frugivores. They dedicate anywhere from 55 to 90% of feeding time to fruit, but also eat plant parts such as leaves, flowers, seeds, and aerial roots. Although they feed on a diverse variety of taxa, they are specialists in that they feed on ripe fruit, which is easy to penetrate, thus necessitating a wide species foraging range due to their reliance on seasonally fruiting resources. Their ability to swallow fruits with large seeds rich in lipids enables dispersal of plant species that are rarely dispersed by other species.  In addition to the primary influence of fruit availability, the location of water resources, sleeping sites, climatic extremes, and patrolling of range boundaries are all factors that influence spider monkey species ranges. Published research on other spider monkey subspecies suggests that their home range requires anywhere from 95-390 ha in continuous forest. These numbers remain unconfirmed for the Azuero spider monkey subspecies.

Threats to survival
Due to the highly reduced and fragmented nature of the tropical dry forest habitat that originally covered nearly the entire Azuero peninsula, forest remnants large enough to support Azuero spider monkey populations are rare.  This deforestation and the hunting of individuals make up the two most influential factors threatening the survival of Azuero spider monkey populations.

Research
The Mohamed bin Zayed Species Conservation Fund has provided funding for research on the Azuero spider monkey. This research is looking into aspects of what the Azuero spider monkey eats, what constitutes a corridor, and how spider monkeys are key indicators of forest health.

References

External links 
http://www.azueroearthproject.org
http://www.speciesconservation.org/projects/Azuero-Spider-Monkey/586
http://environment.yale.edu/elti/
https://web.archive.org/web/20110203132328/http://prorena.research.yale.edu/home.htm

Primates of Central America
Spider monkeys